Delfino López Aparicio (9 February 1960 – 20 December 2020) was a Mexican politician.

Biography
He served as a Deputy from 1 September 2018 till his death in office in 2020. He was a member of the National Regeneration Movement.

He died from COVID-19 during the COVID-19 pandemic in Mexico on 20 December 2020, aged 60. He was the second member of the Mexican Chamber of Deputies to succumb to the pandemic, after the death of Miguel Acundo González in September.

References

External links
 Perfil del legislador

1960 births
2020 deaths
21st-century Mexican politicians
Morena (political party) politicians
Members of the Chamber of Deputies (Mexico)
National Autonomous University of Mexico alumni
Deaths from the COVID-19 pandemic in Mexico